The Other Woman is a 1931 British drama film directed by G. B. Samuelson and starring Isobel Elsom, David Hawthorne and Eva Moore. It was made as a quota quickie.

Cast
 Isobel Elsom as Roxanne Paget  
 David Hawthorne as Anthony Paget  
 Eva Moore as Mrs. Wycherly  
 Pat Paterson as Prudence Wycherly  
 Gladys Frazin as Minerva Derwent  
 Jane Vaughan as Marian 
 Mervin Pearce
 Sam Wilkinson

References

Bibliography
 Chibnall, Steve. Quota Quickies: The Birth of the British 'B' Film. British Film Institute, 2007.
 Low, Rachael. Filmmaking in 1930s Britain. George Allen & Unwin, 1985.
 Wood, Linda. British Films, 1927-1939. British Film Institute, 1986.

External links

1931 films
British drama films
1931 drama films
1930s English-language films
Films directed by G. B. Samuelson
Quota quickies
Films set in England
British black-and-white films
1930s British films